Nastassia Siarheyeuna Mironchyk-Ivanova (born 13 April 1989) is a Belarusian long jumper. In 2011, she became known for missing the World Championships gold medal because of her hair style. Her pony-tail left a mark in the sand well behind her body's 6.90 m mark.

On 25 November 2016 the IOC disqualified her from the 2012 Olympic Games and struck her results from the record for failing a drugs test in a re-analysis of her doping sample from 2012.

She was upgraded from fourth at the 2011 World Championships in Athletics to the bronze medal position as a result of a doping ban against Russian Olga Kucherenko, who had originally won the silver.

In 2019, she won the silver medal in the team event at the 2019 European Games held in Minsk, Belarus.

International competitions

References
 

1989 births
Living people
People from Slutsk
Belarusian female long jumpers
Athletes (track and field) at the 2012 Summer Olympics
Athletes (track and field) at the 2016 Summer Olympics
Olympic athletes of Belarus
World Athletics Championships athletes for Belarus
Doping cases in athletics
Belarusian sportspeople in doping cases
Athletes (track and field) at the 2019 European Games
European Games medalists in athletics
European Games silver medalists for Belarus
Athletes (track and field) at the 2020 Summer Olympics
Sportspeople from Minsk Region